Carlo Mazzarella (30 July 1919 – 7 March 1993) was an Italian actor and journalist.

Life and career 
Born in Genoa, Mazzarella enrolled in the Silvio d’Amico Academy of Dramatic Arts, graduating in 1942. Almost immediately he debuted on stage,  working with Anna Proclemer and Sergio Tofano, among others.

In the aftermath of the Second World War, Mazzarella started a prolific film career as a character actor. In 1955 he started a new career as a television journalist for RAI TV, specializing on news about costume, theater and cinema, and gradually abandoning his acting career. He retired in 1985. Mazzarella died of lung cancer at the age of 73.

Partial filmography

 His Young Wife (1945) - Paglieri, il notaio
 The Models of Margutta (1946) - L'esattore
 Felicità perduta (1946)
 Il vento m'ha cantato una canzone (1947)
 Christmas at Camp 119 (1947) - Ignazio (uncredited)
 Arrivederci papà (1948)
 Bitter Rice (1949) - Gianetto
 Vivere a sbafo (1949)
 Snow White and the Seven Thieves (1949) - Ladro
 The Knight Has Arrived! (1950) - L'Assessore (uncredited)
 Cops and Robbers (1951)
 Seven Hours of Trouble (1951) - Ludovico
 Toto in Color (1952) - Il fidanzato de la signora snob
 In Olden Days (1952) - Corteggiatore (segment "Pot-pourri di canzoni") / Quarto testimone (segment "Il processo di Frine") (uncredited)
 Toto and the Women (1952) - Il presentatore del concorso di bellezza (uncredited)
 The Unfaithfuls (1953) - The Photographer (uncredited)
 I Chose Love (1953)
 Era lei che lo voleva! (1953) - (uncredited)
 Eager to Live (1953) - Carletto
 Cinema d'altri tempi (1953)
 Gran Varietà (1954) - (episodio 'Mariantonia')
 Neapolitan Carousel (1954) - Baron
 An American in Rome (1954) - Segretario ambasciata USA (uncredited)
 A Hero of Our Times (1955) - Journalist
 Bravissimo (1955) - A passerby
 Destination Piovarolo (1955) - Il capostazione uscente
 The Bigamist (1956) - Journalist (uncredited)
 Kean: Genius or Scoundrel (1957) - Dario
 Il disco volante (1964) - Reporter (uncredited)
 Lucky Luciano (1973) - Radio Journalist (final film role)

References

External links 
 

1919 births
1993 deaths
Italian male film actors
Writers from Genoa
Italian male journalists
Italian male stage actors
Actors from Genoa
20th-century Italian male actors
Accademia Nazionale di Arte Drammatica Silvio D'Amico alumni
Deaths from lung cancer in Lazio
20th-century Italian journalists
20th-century Italian male writers